Toussaint is both a French surname and a masculine French given name. Notable people with the name include:

Surname
 Allen Toussaint (1938–2015), American musician, songwriter and record producer
 André Toussaint, Haitian singer and guitarist
 Auguste Toussaint (1911–1990s), Mauritian archivist and historian
 Beth Toussaint (born 1962), American actress, best known for her television performances
 Cheryl Toussaint (born 1952), American athlete who mainly competed in the 800 metres
 Dany Toussaint, candidate in the 2006 Haitian presidential election
 Godfried Toussaint, Belgian, British, and Canadian professor of computer science specializing in computational geometry and computational music
 Eugenio Toussaint (1954–2011), Mexican composer
 Fitzgerald Toussaint, American football player 
 François-Vincent Toussaint (1715–1772), author of Les Mœurs ("The Manners") published in 1748 and immediately prosecuted and burned by the French court of justice
 Franz Joseph Toussaint, Minister of Finance to Empress Maria Theresa
 Jean Toussaint (born 1960), American-British jazz saxophonist
 Jean Joseph Henri Toussaint (1847–1890), French veterinarian and bacteriologist
 Jean-Philippe Toussaint (born 1957), Belgian writer
 Kira Toussaint, Dutch swimmer
 Lorraine Toussaint (born 1960), television actress best known for playing assistant medical examiner Elaine Duchamps on the television drama Crossing Jordan
 Marie Toussaint (born 1987), French politician
 Mauricio Toussaint (born 1960), contemporary Mexican artist
 Michel'le Toussaint, an American R&B singer-songwriter
 Nina Toussaint-White (born 1985), British actress
 Olivier Toussaint, French composer, pop singer, orchestra arranger, company manager, and record producer active since 1968
 Ven. Pierre Toussaint, Haitian-American philanthropist
 Randolph Toussaint (born 1955), Guyanese cyclist
 Roger Toussaint (born 1956), former president of Transport Workers Union (TWU) Local 100 and announced the 2005 New York City transit strike
 Rose Marie Toussaint, Haitian-American transplant surgeon
 Rudolf Toussaint, the German Army commander in Prague at the end of World War II, imprisoned for life for war crimes
 Touki Toussaint, American baseball player

Middle name
 Oliver Toussaint Jackson (1862–1948), American businessman

Given name
 Toussaint (leper chief) (c. 1890–unknown), chief of a leper colony in South America
 Toussaint Charbonneau (1767–1843), French-Canadian explorer and trader, member of the Lewis and Clark Expedition, best known as the husband of Sacagawea
 Toussaint de Charpentier (1779–1847), German geologist and entomologist
 Toussaint Dallam (born 1659), French organ-builder
 Toussaint Dubreuil (c. 1560–1602), French painter associated with the second School of Fontainebleau
 Toussaint-Bernard Émeric-David (1755–1839), French archaeologist and writer on art
 Toussaint Hočevar (1927–1987), Slovenian-American economic historian
 Toussaint-Antoine-Rodolphe Laflamme (1827–1893), French-Canadian lawyer, professor of law and politician
 Toussaint Louverture (1743–1803), freed black slave and former French general who led the Haitian Revolution expelling the French, British, and Spanish armies that enforced slavery in Haiti and nearby Santo Domingo
 Toussaint McCall (born 1934), American R&B singer and organist
 Toussaint Natama (born 1982), Burkinabé football player

French-language surnames
French masculine given names